"Star" is a song by the  R&B/funk band Earth, Wind & Fire, released as a single in September 1979 on ARC/Columbia Records. The single reached No. 16 on the UK Singles Chart.

Overview
"Star" was produced by Maurice White and written by White, Allee Willis and Eduardo Del Barrio. The single's b-side was a song called "You and I". Both songs came from EW&F's 1979 studio album I Am.

Critical reception
Ace Adams of the New York Daily News called "Star" one of the album's "best songs". Simon Ludgate of Record Mirror exclaimed "You can take EWF on many different levels. Some call them disco, some see them as cosmic. Whatever, no one will deny they are excellent." Allen Weiner of Morning Call found that "Star a follow-up to EW&F's smash "Shining Star" is a powerful, melodic song that out-boogies such masters of funk as Parliament Funkadelic."  Cash Box called it a "crackling pop-funk number, which moves from a somber keyboard intro into a joyous, upbeat rhyme." Record World said that it has Earth, Wind & Fire's "trademark falsetto vocals, spirited horn charts and energetic dance beat."

Personnel 

 Writing, lyrics - Allee Willis, Eddie Del Barrio, Maurice White
 Producer - Maurice White

Producer

 Arranger - Tom Tom 84
 Programmer - Steve Porcaro

Engineers 

 Engineer - George Massenburg, Tom Perry
 Mixing Engineer - George Massenburg
 Assistant engineer - Craig Widby, Ross Pallone

Charts

Weekly charts

Year-end charts

References

1979 singles
1979 songs
Earth, Wind & Fire songs
Songs written by Allee Willis
Songs written by Maurice White
Columbia Records singles